The First Peoples’ Cultural Council (FPCC) is a First Nations governed Crown Corporation of the province of British Columbia, Canada. It is based in Brentwood Bay, British Columbia on Tsartlip First Nation. The organization was formerly known as the First Peoples' Heritage, Language and Culture Council, but shortened its name in 2012.

Established in 1990 through the First Peoples' Heritage, Language and Culture Act, FPCC has been offering services and programs to support Indigenous language, arts, and culture revitalization in British Columbia.

The mandate of the organization is to:
 Provide funding to First Nations cultural and language programs
 Support and advise government and First Nations leadership on initiatives, programs and services related to First Nations arts, language and culture
 Provide services and resources to help revitalize the cultural legacy of First Nations people
 Advocate for First Nations heritage and culture

Base funding for FPCC is provided through the Ministry of Indigenous Affairs and Reconciliation and further funds are raised through partnerships with public and private agencies (including the New Relationship Trust, the BC Arts Council and the Department of Canadian Heritage).

Programs 
FPCC pursues its mandate through the following programs:

FirstVoices 
FirstVoices is an online indigenous language archive that participating communities can independently develop to house their orthography, alphabet, oral dictionaries, phrases, songs and stories. It also offers an interactive language tutor system. Over 60 communities archive their languages on FirstVoices, and 35 of those are open to the public.

On January 29, 2018, the First Peoples’ Cultural Council announced the relaunch of a beta (preview) version of FirstVoices.com, its online Indigenous language archiving and learning resource. See www.firstvoices.com.

FirstVoices Apps

FirstVoices has developed 13 interactive dictionary apps for Apple's iSO and Android. The apps contain text, audio, image and video content and are available as free downloads from the iTunes and Google Play stores.

The dictionary apps include the following Indigenous languages, which are all spoken in British Columbia: Ehattesaht, Halq’eméylem, Hlg̲aagilda X̲aayda Kil, Ktunaxa, Kwak’wala, Nazko-Dakelh, Nisg̲a’a, Northern St’at’imcets, Secwepemc, SENĆOŦEN, Tla’amin, Ucwalmícwts, Xeni Gwet’in.

FirstVoices Keyboards

FirstVoices Keyboards is an Indigenous language app available for free download on Apple and Android mobile devices. Regular keypads on mobile devices are not capable of generating many of the special characters of Indigenous languages, making texting in these languages impossible for most Indigenous people. FirstVoices Keyboards, an evolution of FirstVoices Chat, allows speakers of over 100 Indigenous languages in Canada, Australia, New Zealand and the USA to use their mobile devices to text, email, use social media, and create documents using keyboards designed for their languages.

Language Tutor

In 2009, FirstVoices launched the FirstVoices Language Tutor, an interactive, online teaching application. The FirstVoices Language Tutor delivers graduated language exercises in vocabulary development, reading comprehension, listening and speaking. Language Tutor lessons are customizable and can be targeted to specific age groups or curriculum. Any word or phrase in an existing FirstVoices language archive can be used in a Language Tutor lesson, or new words and phrases can be added. The Language Tutor also offers a student tracking system that allows teachers to follow the progress of an entire classroom of students.

Language Lab

The FirstVoices Language Lab is an iPad-based language-teaching app designed to deliver FirstVoices Language Tutor lesson content via a stand-alone portable language laboratory. No Internet access is required for the Language Lab to run.

Language Programs 

Language Nests

Funded by the First Nations Health Authority – Interior Region, the Language Nests provide language immersion for young children and their families through day-care and after-school care.
To learn more about this program follow this link 

Language Revitalization Planning

 The Language Revitalization Planning Program brings together communities that share a language to design and deliver a language revitalization plan.
To learn more about this program follow this link 

Mentor-Apprentice Program

The Mentor-Apprentice Program pairs a fluent Elder with a committed learner for one year so that the learner can become fluent and pass the language on to others.
To learn more about this program follow this links 

The Aboriginal Languages Initiative (ALI)

A federally funded program through the Department of Canadian Heritage, the Aboriginal Language Initiative provides funding for community projects to maintain, revitalize and promote First Nations languages.

 The B.C. Languages Initiative (BCLI)

The British Columbia Language Initiative is a provincially funded program through the First Citizens' Fund.
It supports language projects that seek to revitalize First Nations' languages in British Columbia.

First Peoples' Language Map of British Columbia

The First Peoples' Language Map of British Columbia is an interactive representation of B.C. that roughly divides the province based on First Nations language boundaries. 
From the map, visitors can access a list of the First Nations in B.C. and information about them including what language they speak and where they are located. Visitors can also scroll through the languages section, which houses detailed information about the First Nations languages of B.C. 
All the information on the First Peoples' Language Map of British Columbia is provided by First Nations communities. These communities can upload new information and expand their First Nations and language section as they see fit.

Silent Speaker Program

The First Peoples’ Cultural Council (FPCC) Silent Speaker Course is for people who understand but do not speak their First Nations language. The course is based on a successful program that was developed in Norway and Sweden for and by Indigenous Sami people. The model uses Cognitive Behaviour Therapy (CBT) to support silent speakers to overcome blockages about using their Indigenous language in their communities.

Language and Culture Camps

Initiated in 2008, the Language and Culture Camps Program creates an opportunity for First Nations' families, Elders, youth and children to be immersed in their languages and cultures. This program is currently on hold due to funding constraints.
To learn more about this program follow this link 

Endangered Language Project

Launched in June 2012, the Endangered Languages Project (ELP) is a worldwide collaboration between Indigenous language organizations, linguists, institutions of higher education, and key industry partners to strengthen endangered languages. First Peoples' Cultural Council is one of the four founding organization of the project.

To learn more about ELP see website.

Arts Programs 
The First Peoples' Cultural Council's arts program supports the development of First Nations artists and arts organizations with funding through the Indigenous Arts Program , by providing mentoring, workshops, resources and organizational capacity building workshops.

 Indigenous Arts Program (IAP)

In partnership with BC Arts Council and Margaret A. Cargill, the arts program provides grants to Indigenous artists, organizations and collectives, through a peer assessment review.

Applicants may apply for funding in the following areas: Emerging Individual Artists, Sharing Traditional Arts Across generations, Organizations and Collectives, Arts Administrator Internships and Mentorships.

 Indigenous Music Initiative (IMI)

In partnership with Creative BC, the Indigenous Music Initiative is designed to support artists, projects and events that grow and develop British Columbia’s Creative Industries. Successful ventures will increase participation of Indigenous music industry professionals and strengthen the capacity of B.C.’s Indigenous music industry through knowledge transfer, skill development, and the creation of new business opportunities in B.C. and elsewhere.

Applicants can apply for funding through the following programs: Emerging Music Industry Professional, Expanding Capacity in the Indigenous Music Recording Industry, Touring, Promotions/Marketing and Performance Initiatives, and the Indigenous Music Retreat.

Online Arts Toolkit

The online arts toolkit provides Indigenous artists with access to information and materials that can assist them in their careers, such as a grant writing handbook and an arts portfolio handbook.

Resources 

In addition to developing programs to assist language revitalization efforts and support artists in First Nations communities, the First Peoples' Cultural Council also develops resources to educate the population of British Columbia about Indigenous languages and their endangered status in B.C.

'The First Peoples' Language Map of British Columbia divides the province of British Columbia by approximate language boundary. It also houses comprehensive data on the First Nations and their languages based on Language Needs Assessments, which are filled out by communities seeking language funding from the First Peoples' Cultural Council. The Language Map database continues to grow as communities update and fill out new Language Needs Assessments.

Report on the Status of B.C. First Nations Languages

The 2010 Report on the Status of B.C. First Nations Languages provides concrete data on the state of B.C. First Nations languages, including the number of speakers remaining, the number of students learning the languages, the resources available for each language and information on the language revitalization work being done in the province.

The key findings of the 2010 report include:

Fluent First Nations language speakers made up 5% of the reporting population and the majority of those are over the age of 65.
People that reported as semi-fluent made up 8% of the reporting population and the level of fluency varies widely among this group.
A student enrolled in a First-Nations-operated school spends one to four hours learning a First Nations language per week. However, 34% of students attending a school of this type reported that they are not learning a First Nations language.
At their current rate of decline, the majority of First Nations languages could be extinct within five to six years.
The 2014 Report on the Status of B.C. First Nations Languages, Second Edition acted as a follow up examination of the context presented by the 2010 report. Key findings include:
 In 2014, fluent speakers of First Nations languages made up 4.08% (5,289) of the total population reported. 
 Semi-fluent speakers made up 9.32% (12,092) of the population reported. This is an increase of 3,144 speakers over the 2010 numbers. 
 One in three semi-fluent speakers (29%) is under the age of 25 and 88% of all semi-fluent speakers are under the age of 65.
 120 communities (65% of those reporting) have recordings of their language available as a community resource. This number has more than doubled since 2010.

Additional resources 

Language legislation 

In December 2016, Prime Minister Justin Trudeau announced that the federal government would be developing legislation to support the revitalization Indigenous languages in Canada. In his announcement, he stated that, "our government will enact an Indigenous Languages Act, co-developed with Indigenous Peoples, with the goal of ensuring the preservation, protection, and revitalization of First Nations, Metis, and Inuit languages in this country."

The First Peoples’ Cultural Council held regional sessions in May and June 2017 to talk about the promised Indigenous language legislation for Canada. The organization's goal was to ensure that B.C. language experts would be well-informed so that when the national Assembly of First Nations (AFN) conducted its consultations, everyone would be prepared to provide input.

FPCC compiled a report based on the information that was gathered at these sessions, and also encouraged First Nations communities to develop their own position papers to submit to the Minister of the Department of Canadian Heritage and the National AFN.

For more information on the Language Legislation, Assembly of First Nations Engagement Sessions, regional engagement and information sessions, and language reports see FPCC's Language Legislation page.

Media coverage 
First Peoples' Cultural Council's News Room

"B.C. school preserving First Nations languages". CTV. 2016-06-10.
"This Aboriginal Keyboard App Is Helping Preserve Indigenous Languages". Motherboard. 2016-05-31.
"Keyboard app brings Indigenous languages to mobile". CBC. 2016-05-18.
"BC Ferries' newest vessels will be covered with First Nations art". VanCity Buzz. 2016-03-29.
"First Nations language advocates hoping for new funding in federal budget". iPolitics. 2016-03-16.
"Royal B.C. Museum's First Nations language exhibit wins award". Times Colonist. 2015-04-29.

References

External links
The First Peoples' Cultural Council
First Peoples' Cultural Foundation
FirstVoices
The First Peoples' Language Mapping Website
First Peoples Arts Map
Twitter page
YouTube page
Flickr page
Facebook page

Crown corporations of British Columbia
Cultural promotion organizations
First Nations culture
First Nations in British Columbia